Tristanieae is a tribe in the plant family Myrtaceae from south-east Asia and Oceania.

Genera
Cloezia (New Caledonia)
Tristania (Australia)
Thaleropia (Australia)
Xanthomyrtus (from Philippines to New Caledonia)

References

Rosid tribes
Myrtaceae